The 1987 Valencian regional election was held on Wednesday, 10 June 1987, to elect the 2nd Corts of the Valencian Community. All 89 seats in the Corts were up for election. The election was held simultaneously with regional elections in twelve other autonomous communities and local elections all throughout Spain, as well as the 1987 European Parliament election.

The Spanish Socialist Workers' Party (PSOE), suffering from a strong loss of popular support, lost 9 seats together with the absolute majority it had achieved in 1983. However, the PSOE remained as the largest party by a great margin due to the splitting up of the vote between the opposition parties. Incumbent President Joan Lerma was able to retain government thanks to the support of the IU-UPV alliance, and went on to form a minority government.

The People's Coalition had broken up after the 1986 general election. As a result, the People's Alliance (AP) and the People's Democratic Party (PDP) contested the election separately. AP, with future Mayoress of Valencia Rita Barberá as regional candidate, scored slightly less than 24% of the vote and lost 2 seats compared to the combined totals for the AP-PDP-UL coalition in 1983, while the PDP was swept out of the Courts entirely.

On the other hand, the election saw an increase of support for minor parties: Centrist Democratic and Social Centre (CDS) experienced a significant increase of its popular support and became the third political force in the region with over 10% of the share. The regionalist right-wing Valencian Union (UV), which ran separately for the first time, won 6 seats to the 5 it had obtained within the People's Coalition in 1983. The Communist Party of Spain (PCE), which had formed the electoral alliance United Left (IU) in April 1986 with other smaller left-wing parties across Spain, stood in coalition with the regional Valencian People's Unity (UPV) and won 6 seats.

Overview

Electoral system
The Corts Valencianes were the devolved, unicameral legislature of the Valencian autonomous community, having legislative power in regional matters as defined by the Spanish Constitution and the Valencian Statute of Autonomy, as well as the ability to vote confidence in or withdraw it from a President of the Government. Voting for the Corts was on the basis of universal suffrage, which comprised all nationals over 18 years of age, registered in the Valencian Community and in full enjoyment of their political rights.

The 89 members of the Corts Valencianes were elected using the D'Hondt method and a closed list proportional representation, with a threshold of 5 percent of valid votes—which included blank ballots—being applied regionally. Parties not reaching the threshold were not taken into consideration for seat distribution. Seats were allocated to constituencies, corresponding to the provinces of Alicante, Castellón and Valencia. Each constituency was entitled to an initial minimum of 20 seats, with the remaining 29 allocated among the constituencies in proportion to their populations on the condition that the seat to population ratio in any given province did not exceed three times that of any other.

The electoral law provided that parties, federations, coalitions and groupings of electors were allowed to present lists of candidates. However, groupings of electors were required to secure the signature of at least 1 percent of the electors registered in the constituency for which they sought election. Electors were barred from signing for more than one list of candidates. Concurrently, parties and federations intending to enter in coalition to take part jointly at an election were required to inform the relevant Electoral Commission within ten days of the election being called.

Election date
The term of the Corts Valencianes expired four years after the date of their previous election. The election Decree was required to be issued no later than the twenty-fifth day prior to the date of expiry of parliament and published on the following day in the Official Journal of the Valencian Community, with election day taking place between the fifty-fourth and the sixtieth day from publication. The previous election was held on 8 May 1983, which meant that the legislature's term would have expired on 8 May 1987. The election Decree was required to be published no later than 14 April 1987, with the election taking place no later than the sixtieth day from publication, setting the latest possible election date for the Corts on Saturday, 13 June 1987.

The Corts Valencianes could not be dissolved before the date of expiry of parliament.

Opinion polls
The table below lists voting intention estimates in reverse chronological order, showing the most recent first and using the dates when the survey fieldwork was done, as opposed to the date of publication. Where the fieldwork dates are unknown, the date of publication is given instead. The highest percentage figure in each polling survey is displayed with its background shaded in the leading party's colour. If a tie ensues, this is applied to the figures with the highest percentages. The "Lead" column on the right shows the percentage-point difference between the parties with the highest percentages in a poll. When available, seat projections determined by the polling organisations are displayed below (or in place of) the percentages in a smaller font; 45 seats were required for an absolute majority in the Corts Valencianes.

Results

Overall

Distribution by constituency

Aftermath

Notes

References
Opinion poll sources

Other

1987 in the Valencian Community
Valencian Community
Regional elections in the Valencian Community
June 1987 events in Europe